Jean George Robichaud (July 26, 1883 – August 6, 1969) was a fish merchant and political figure in New Brunswick. He represented Gloucester County in the Legislative Assembly of New Brunswick from 1917 to 1922 and Gloucester in the House of Commons of Canada from 1922 to 1926 as a Liberal member.

He was born in Shippegan, New Brunswick, the son of George Robichaud and Philomene de Grasse. In 1909, he married Amanda Boudreau. Robichaud served as a member of the county council from 1913 to 1915.

His son Hédard and his great-nephew Fernand Robichaud both served in the House of Commons and the Senate of Canada.

References 
 
 Canadian Parliamentary Guide, 1925, AL Normandin

1883 births
1969 deaths
Members of the House of Commons of Canada from New Brunswick
Liberal Party of Canada MPs
New Brunswick Liberal Association MLAs
People from Gloucester County, New Brunswick